Bellafina (foaled April 29, 2016) is an American Thoroughbred racehorse and the winner of the 2018 Del Mar Debutante Stakes.

Career
Bellafina's first race was on July 4, 2018, where she came in 2nd place at Los Alamitos. Bellafina's next race was on August 5, 2018, where she won the 2018 Sorrento Stakes.

Bellafina continued to win with victories at the 2018 Del Mar Debutante Stakes and the 2018 Chandelier Stakes.

Starting on January 6, 2019, Bellafina went on a three race win streak, picking up victories at the Santa Ynez Stakes, the Las Virgenes Stakes and the Santa Anita Oaks.

References

2016 racehorse births
American racehorses
Racehorses bred in Kentucky
Racehorses trained in the United States
Thoroughbred family 9
American Grade 1 Stakes winners